Events from the year 1671 in China.

Incumbents 
 Kangxi Emperor (10th year)

Viceroys
 Viceroy of Zhejiang — Zhao Tingchen
 Viceroy of Fujian — Liu Dou 
 Viceroy of Chuan-Hu — Cai Yurong
 Viceroy of Shan-Shaan — Luoduo
 Viceroy of Liangguang — Zhou Youde, Quan Guangzu
 Viceroy of Yun-Gui — Gan Wenkun
 Viceroy of Liangjiang —  Maleji

Events
 Because poor, marginal lands were exempted from the annual land tax, and the Qing court rewarded officials who could induce people to expand cultivated land. Therefore the Viceroy of Chuan-Hu, Cai Yurong, observed that “there is an abundance of cultivated land in Szechwan, but there are not enough people to cultivate it,” the throne decreed that “those who were willing to settle in Szechwan were to be tax-exempt for a period of five years and that any local official who could attract three hundred immigrants would be promoted immediately. (See )
 Sino-Russian border conflicts

Deaths
 Geng Jimao, Ming-turned-Qing general

References

 
 .

 
China